The 2019–20 Essex Senior Football League season was the 49th in the history of Essex Senior Football League, a football competition in England.

The provisional club allocations for steps 5 and 6 were announced by the FA on 19 May 2019. The constitution was ratified by the league at its AGM.

League suspension and season abandonment
Due to the coronavirus pandemic, and in line with directives from The FA, the Essex Senior League issued a statement on 16 March confirming the postponement of forthcoming matches.

As a result of the COVID-19 pandemic, this season's competition was formally abandoned on 26 March 2020, with all results from the season being expunged, and no promotion or relegation taking place to, from, or within the competition. On 30 March 2020, sixty-six non-league clubs sent an open letter to the Football Association requesting that they reconsider their decision.

Essex Senior League
At the end of the 2018–19 season, the following teams left the league:
 Promoted to Step 4
 Hullbridge Sports, to the Isthmian League North Division
 Relegated to Step 6
 Barkingside, to the Eastern Senior League
 Leyton Athletic, to the Eastern Senior League
 Transferred within Step 5
 Stanway Rovers, to the Eastern Counties League Premier Division

The remaining 16 teams, together with the following, form the Essex Senior League for season 2019–20:
 Promoted from Step 6
 Hashtag United, from the Eastern Senior League
 Transferred within Step 5
 Cockfosters, from the Spartan South Midlands League
 Hadley, from the Spartan South Midlands League

League table

Results table

References

2019
9
Essex Senior Football League